During the 2012–13 season Bury competed in the third tier of English football, Football League One.

League table

First-team squad

Out on loan

Reserve squad

Squad statistics

Appearances and goals

|-
|colspan="14"|Players played for Bury this season who are no longer at the club:

|-
|colspan="14"|Players who played for Bury on loan and returned to their parent club:

|}

Top scorers

Disciplinary record

Results and fixtures

Pre-season friendlies

League One
bury 2 Fleetwood 0

FA Cup

League Cup

Football League Trophy

Transfers

Awards

References

Bury F.C. seasons
Bury